Juan Luis Vázquez Suárez is Professor of Applied Mathematics at Universidad Autónoma de Madrid (UAM), Spain.

Education
He was born in Oviedo on July 26, 1946. In the years 1964/69 he studied Telecommunication Engineering at the Superior Technical School of Ingenieros de Telecomunicación (ETSIT) in Madrid. In 1973 he graduated in Mathematics at the  Universidad Complutense de Madrid, where he also obtained the Ph. D. degree in 1979 with a thesis directed by Haïm Brezis.

Contributions
Outstanding researcher in concrete areas of the mathematics such as nonlinear partial differential equations and their applications. He is author of numerous research articles in scientific journals like Archive for Rational Mechanics and Analysis, Communications on Pure and Applied Mathematics, Journal de mathématiques pures et appliquées, Advances in Mathematics among others. He was president of Spanish Society for Applied Mathematics (SEMA) in the period 1996/98.  Organizer of international events like the International Conference on Free Boundaries FB1993 (Toledo, Spain) or the Summer Schools at the Universidad Internacional Menéndez Pelayo, UIMP.

Awards and honors
He obtained the Spanish National Prize of Research in Mathematics (Premio Nacional de Investigación Julio Rey Pastor) in 2003, and that year he was included in the  Thomson Reuters list of Highly Cited Scientists.

He was invited as main speaker at the International Congress of Mathematicians held in Madrid in 2006 (ICM2006) with the plenary conference entitled "Nonlinear diffusion, from analysis to physics and geometry."

In 2012 he became a fellow of the American Mathematical Society.

Books 
 The Porous Medium Equation. Mathematical Theory. Oxford University Press, 2006, Clarendon Press, 648 pages, 234x156 mm. Series: Oxford Mathematical Monographs.
 Smoothing and Decay Estimates for Nonlinear Diffusion Equations. Equations of Porous Medium Type. Oxford University Press, August 2006, 248 pages, 234x156 mm, Oxford Lecture Series.
 A Stability Technique for Evolution Partial Differential Equations. A Dynamical Systems Approach. PNLDE 56 (Progress in Non-Linear Differential Equations and Their Applications), Birkhäuser Verlag, 2003, 391 pages. (with V.A. Galaktionov.)
 Recent Trends in Partial Differential Equations. American Mathematical Society, 2006, 123 pages, Series: Contemporary Mathematics number 409; (with X. Cabré and José A. Carrillo)

References

External links 

Official Web Page
Departamento de Matemáticas UAM

1946 births
Living people
21st-century Spanish mathematicians
People from Oviedo
Fellows of the American Mathematical Society
20th-century Spanish mathematicians
Academic staff of the Autonomous University of Madrid